Idlib Governorate clashes took place during the Syrian civil war, those may refer to the following phases of conflict:
 Idlib Governorate clashes (September 2011–March 2012) – first wave of violence
 April 2012 Idlib Governorate Operation – an organized assault by Syrian Army in Idlib province prior to UN brokered cease-fire
 Idlib Governorate clashes (June 2012–April 2013) – third phase of violence, resulted in a stalemate
 2014 Idlib offensive – rebel advances
 al-Nusra Front–SRF/Hazzm Movement conflict – fighting between al-Nusra Front and FSA groups
 October 2016 Idlib Governorate clashes – fighting between Jund al-Aqsa and other rebels
 Idlib Governorate clashes (January–March 2017) – wider rebel infighting in Idlib
 Idlib Governorate clashes (July 2017) – more infighting between Ahrar al-Sham and Tahrir al-Sham
 Turkish military operation in Idlib Governorate – Turkish Army operation in northern Idlib